Folldal is the administrative centre of Folldal Municipality in Innlandet county, Norway. The village is located along the river Folla which is a tributary of the large river Glåma. The village grew up around the old Folldal mine. The village lies at the intersection of Norwegian County Road 29 and Norwegian County Road 27. Folldal Church is located on the east side of the village.

Folldal is located a short distance east of Dovre National Park and Rondane National Park.

References

Folldal
Villages in Innlandet